Van Williams (born December 5, 1966) is an American drummer, best known as the former drummer of Nevermore. Van Williams hails from New York where he began his music career in various bands, later relocating to Seattle, Washington in 1993. After auditioning for the band Nevermore (ex Sanctuary) they were soon signed onto Century Media Records. He used to play drums for Ashes of Ares and Armageddon, and he currently drums for Ghost Ship Octavius and musical project Pure Sweet Hell.

Williams continued to play with Nevermore until 2011 when he announced along with Jeff Loomis that he was leaving the band. Also a graphic artist/illustrator, Van has created the logos and numerous T-shirt designs for Nevermore and his other band project Pure Sweet Hell which features Van singing main vocals as well as drums. Pure Sweet Hell also features long time friends and fellow musicians Chris Eichhorn (guitars and bass) and Jim Colson (also supplying vocals). The new Pure Sweet Hell album will feature guitar solos from a few of heavy metal's top shredders, including Glen Drover (Eidolon, Megadeth) Steve Smyth (Nevermore, Testament, Forbidden), Chris Amott (Arch Enemy), Jeff Loomis (Nevermore) and Attila Voros (Leander, Nevermore). John Winters (Hatefist), also who contributed in the production/engineering of the record. On June 26, 2012, former Iced Earth vocalist Matt Barlow announced on his Facebook page the creation of a new band named Ashes of Ares with former Iced Earth bassist Freddie Vidales and former Nevermore drummer Van Williams, posting on YouTube two one-minute teaser videos. Shortly afterward, Van Williams was also announced as the drummer of Ghost Ship Octavius, featuring former God Forbid guitarist Matt Wicklund and vocalist Adōn Fanion. Ghost Ship Octavius released their debut album on March 23, 2015.

Equipment
Van Williams endorses Pearl drums, Sabian cymbal, toontracks and ProMark Sticks.

Drums: Pearl MMX maple
10x8" tom
12x9" tom
13x10" tom
13x5.5" snare
16x16" floor tom

Cymbals: Sabian Cymbals
22" professional power ride
18",20" professional power china
8",10" rock splash
17",18", rock crash
8" raw bell
13" rock hats
14" regular hats

Drum Sticks
Promark Naturals 5b

Discography

Nevermore
 Nevermore (1995)
 In Memory (EP, 1996)
 The Politics of Ecstasy (1996)
 Dreaming Neon Black (1999)
 Dead Heart in a Dead World (2000)
 Enemies of Reality (2003, remixed in 2005)
 This Godless Endeavor (2005)
 The Year of the Voyager (2008)
 The Obsidian Conspiracy (2010)

Pure Sweet Hell
 Demo 2002 (2002)
 The Voyeurs of Utter Destruction as Beauty (2005)
 Spitting At The Stars (2011)

Ashes of Ares
 Ashes of Ares (2013)

Ghost Ship Octavius
 Ghost Ship Octavius (2015)
 Ghost Ship Octavius Delirium (2018)

References

Living people
1967 births
Nevermore members
20th-century American drummers
American male drummers
20th-century American male musicians